Bárbara Ruiz-Tagle Correa (born Santiago Chile May 30, 1979) is a Chilean actress of theater and television.

Biography 
She graduated from Universidad Finis Terrae in 2001 and traveled to Spain to specialize in theater dance.

She has participated in several TV series and her debut was in the soap opera Corazón de María from TVN, where she played a Russian mail order bride Irina Romanovna, the loved wife of Wladimir (Alfredo Castro).

She was a great asset to the night time soap opera from TVN, El Señor de la Querencia, and more recently in ¿Dónde está Elisa?.

Films

References

External links 
 

1979 births
Actresses from Santiago
Chilean stage actresses
Chilean telenovela actresses
Chilean television actresses
Living people